The 2012 Aberto Santa Catarina de Tenis was a professional tennis tournament played on clay courts. It was the seventh edition of the tournament which was part of the 2012 ATP Challenger Tour. It took place in Blumenau, Brazil between 9 and 15 April 2012.

Singles main-draw entrants

Seeds

 1 Rankings are as of April 2, 2012.

Other entrants
The following players received wildcards into the singles main draw:
  Tiago Fernandes
  Thiago Monteiro
  Bruno Sant'anna
  Bruno Volkmann

The following players received entry from the qualifying draw:
  Alberto Brizzi
  Tiago Lopes
  Dino Marcan
  Grzegorz Panfil

Champions

Singles

 Antonio Veić def.  Paul Capdeville, 3–6, 6–4, 5–2, retired

Doubles

 Marin Draganja /  Dino Marcan def.  Blaž Kavčič /  Antonio Veić, 6–2, 6–0

External links
Official Website
ITF Search
ATP official site

Aberto Santa Catarina de Tenis
Aberto Santa Catarina de Tenis
2012 in Brazilian tennis